Lionel of Antwerp, Duke of Clarence, (29 November 133817 October 1368) was the third son, but the second son to survive infancy, of the English king Edward III and Philippa of Hainault. He was named after his birthplace, at Antwerp in the Duchy of Brabant. Lionel was a grandson of William I, Count of Hainaut.

First marriage
Betrothed as a child to Elizabeth de Burgh, 4th Countess of Ulster (died 1363), daughter and heiress of William Donn de Burgh, 3rd Earl of Ulster, he was married to her in 1352, but before this date, he had entered into possession of her great Irish inheritance. He was called Earl of Ulster from 1347.

Ireland
Having been named as his father's representative in England in 1345 and again in 1346, Lionel joined an expedition into France in 1355, but his chief energies were reserved for the affairs of Ireland.

Appointed governor of that country, he landed at Dublin in 1361, and in November of the following year was created Duke of Clarence, the third dukedom created in England, while his father made an abortive attempt to secure for him the crown of Scotland. His efforts to secure an effective authority over his Irish lands were only moderately successful. After holding a parliament at Kilkenny, which passed the celebrated Statute of Kilkenny in 1366, he dropped the task in disgust and returned to England.

The poet Geoffrey Chaucer was at one time a page in Lionel's household.

Second marriage
After Lionel's first wife Elizabeth died in 1363, a second marriage was arranged. He married Violante Visconti, daughter of Galeazzo Visconti, Lord of Pavia, members of the Visconti family. Her brother, Gian Galeazzo Visconti, was the Duke of Milan. Journeying to fetch his bride, Lionel was received in great state both in France and Italy and was married to Violante at Milan in June 1368. Some months were then spent in festivities, during which Lionel was taken ill at Alba, where he died on 17 October 1368. There was strong speculation at the time that he had been poisoned by his father-in-law, although this has never been proven.

Issue
Lionel had only one child, Philippa, daughter of his first wife Elizabeth. In 1368 she married Edmund Mortimer, 3rd Earl of March. Their granddaughter and eventual heir, Anne Mortimer, married into the Yorkist branch of the English royal family and was the mother of Richard Plantagenet, 3rd Duke of York. Even though Richard was a descendant in the male line of Edward III from Edmund of Langley, Lionel's younger brother, the House of York based its claim to the English throne on descent through the female line from Lionel to the English throne. In doing so, the Yorkists were able to present a senior claim to the English throne over the Lancastrian branch of the English royal family, the descendants of another younger brother, John of Gaunt. (Edward III's first-born son, Edward the Black Prince, had no legitimate descendants past his two sons Edward of Angoulême and King Richard II.)  Lionel was the ancestor of Kings Edward IV, Edward V, Richard III and all later English, and subsequently British, monarchs except for Henry VII, whose wife Elizabeth of York was Lionel's descendant.

Ancestry

Arms

Lionel's arms were at some point those of the kingdom, differenced by a label argent of five points, with each point bearing a cross gules, thus presenting the flag of England's Saint George's cross on each point There are also suggestions, such as the above image, that at some point he bore a differentiating label argent of three points, each bearing a canton gules.

Notes

References

Attribution

Further reading
 

1338 births
1368 deaths
14th-century English nobility
Lionel
Plantagenet
House of Plantagenet
Garter Knights appointed by Edward III
Peers jure uxoris
People from Antwerp
Burials at Clare Priory
Children of Edward III of England
Lords Lieutenant of Ireland
Sons of kings
Peers created by Edward III